The Beatmen were a Slovak rock band singing predominantly in English, that existed from 1964 to 1966. Although they released only 4 songs, they remain one of the most significant bands in the history of the Czechoslovak popular music. They were one of the first widely popular Big Beat bands in Czechoslovakia and they were one of the first bands from behind the iron curtain to play in the western Europe, in Munich. The band was the first bigger success for the singer and guitarist Dežo Ursiny, who later became a legend of the Czechoslovak music.

Music and sound of the Beatmen is mightily influenced especially by The Beatles, as is obvious from the listening. Their song Let's Make A Summer has been highly critically acclaimed and remains one of the best Czechoslovak pop songs ever written.

History
The origins of The Beatmen can be found in the early sixties' Bratislava bands Fontána and Jolana, where the future Beatmen were members. The Beatmen were founded at the end of 1964 by Peter Petro, Miroslav Bedrik and Marián Bednár. They took on lead guitarist Stano Herko, who left subsequently, due to his conservatory duties. His replacement was Dežo Ursiny. Throughout the 1965 they gained wide success. They released their two SPs. They played several successful shows in Prague, including that at Spejbl and Hurvínek Theatre. In May they played at Rokoko theatre, and later they performed at the premiere of the movie Nylonový mesiac (Nylon Moon). Little of this success could have been achieved without the effort of their manager Peter Tuchscher, who was an important person on the Bratislava rock scene those days, managing a number of bands and bringing many of them into spotlight. The Beatmen were his most successful band.

In spring 1966 they performed at Kunstmuseum in Munich, and as a support at the two Manfred Mann shows in Bratislava on October 7, 1965 and October 8, 1965. Manfred Mann were so amazed by them that they wanted to take them as their support for their UK tour, but the negotiations failed. It has been rumoured that The Beatmen were not allowed to go unless Olympic, by then the most successful Czechoslovak rock 'n' roll band from Prague, was to go too. It was not usual that a Slovak act overshadowed a big and stable Czech one and many people were not happy about this fact. This was going to happen several times in the future, e.g. when Slovak Miroslav Žbirka was voted the best male singer of the country instead of the by-then annual winner Karel Gott in 1982. Manfred Mann's management didn't agree on Olympic and so The Beatmen were not allowed to go.

The desire for more fame and artistic freedom without limitations from the political regime made The Beatmen decide to emigrate to West Germany, but without Ursiny, who decided to stay. As a replacement they took on Juraj Eperjesi. On their travel after the concert in Vienna, Peter Petro decided to return home. In Germany they released one single with a new line-up, but it didn't obtain much interest from fans. They split soon thereafter due to personal problems and disappointment from the little success they gained. After some time, Ursiny founded a new band, The Soulmen.

Band line-up
Dežo Ursiny - lead guitar, harmonica, vocals
Miroslav Bedrik - rhythm guitar, vocals
Marián Bednár - bass, vocals
Peter Petro - drums, vocals

Former and later members:

Stano Herko - lead guitar
Juraj Eperjesi - lead guitar
Arno Biller (German) - drums

Discography
SP 1965 (Supraphon):
Safely Arrived (Bedrik/Petro)
The Enchanted Lie (Bedrik/Bednár/Petro)

SP 1965 (Supraphon):
Break It (Ursiny/Petro)
Let's Make A Summer (Ursiny/Petro)

SP 1966 (Intersound) (in Germany):
Stand Up And Go (Eperjesi/Bednár/Bedrik)
As You Love Me (Eperjesi/Eperjesi)

Except their official songs, The Beatmen recorded at least five other songs. These remained unreleased until 1997 and 2000, when they were included on Dežo Ursiny's compilation albums Pevniny a vrchy and Pevniny a vrchy 2. They are: Walkin' Home, Hey Mr. Jones, Schôdzka (Slovak name, but English lyrics), Mám ju rád (in two versions - a cover of Beatles' She Loves You with Slovak lyrics) and Keby som bol Nór (Slovak lyrics).

Samples of the songs

See also
 The Soulmen
 Dežo Ursiny

Notes

Slovak rock music groups
Czechoslovak Big Beat groups and musicians